The Boardwalk Hall Auditorium Organ is the pipe organ in the Main Auditorium of the Boardwalk Hall (formerly known as the Atlantic City Convention Hall) in Atlantic City, New Jersey, built by the Midmer-Losh Organ Company. It is the largest organ in the world, as measured by the number of pipes (officially 33,113, but the exact number is unknown).

Consequently, the organ runs on much higher wind pressures than most organs in order to achieve a volume loud enough to fill the hall.

The organ has four entries in Guinness World Records, including largest pipe organ ever constructed, largest musical instrument ever constructed, and loudest musical instrument ever constructed, and holds several records in the organ world. It is one of only two organs in the world to have an open 64-foot rank, and the only organ to have stops voiced on 100 inches of wind pressure (about 3.6 psi). Its console features seven manuals.

Construction and layout 
Construction of the organ took place between May 1929 and December 1932. The organ was designed by state senator Emerson Lewis Richards and was built by the Midmer-Losh Organ Company of Merrick, New York. Most of the pipes were built by Midmer-Losh. Anton Gottfried made some of the reed pipes, including the Brass Trumpet, Egyptian Horn, Euphone and Musette Mirabilis. The German firm Welte-Mignon provided the Bassoon with papier-mâché resonators and wooden Tuba d'Amour for the Echo division.

The organ is built around the Main Auditorium of the Boardwalk Hall. The organ's divisions are divided across 8 organ chambers:

The current layout of the organ was Emerson Richards' third design. The first design was to house 43,000 pipes in six chambers (all mentioned above without the two Forward chambers), but the quoted cost greatly exceeded the allocated $300,000, and there wasn't enough space to house all the pipes. The number of pipes was then reduced to 29,000. Later, when the Forward Chambers were also used, some stops from the original plan were reinstated, raising the numbers of pipes to the present official number of 33,114 (see also below). The seventh and eighth chambers were placed in the ceiling above the center chambers, as placing them any further back would result in synchronization issues due to the speed of sound, which takes nearly half a second to travel the length of the arena. The contract price was $347,200.

Console 
The organ's main console is the biggest in the world. It has 1,235 stop tabs controlling 587 flue stops, 265 reed stops, 35 melodic percussions, 46 non-melodic percussions, 164 couplers, 18 tremolos, 120 swell pedal selectors for the 6 swell pedals controlling 15 swell boxes, and a stop crescendo pedal. The console is also the only one in the world with 7 manuals. The lowest two (Choir and Great) have a range of seven octaves, and the next lowest (Swell) has a range of six octaves, while the rest have a normal five octave range.  The bottom five keys on the Swell manual (GGG to BBB) are in place mainly for cosmetic reasons, as there are no pipes, in most ranks, for those notes; however, these keys would sound if couplers were activated. The manuals from top to bottom are:

The Great and Choir manuals have been enlarged to seven octaves so that specially extended stops in the pedal can be played throughout the 85 note compass of both manuals. These stops can be selected by stop-keys in two divisions in the right stop jamb. The Grand Great (for the Great Manual) controls stops from the Pedal Right and the Grand Choir (for the Choir Manual) controls stops from the Pedal Left. For example, the Grand Ophicleide can be played from the pedalboard, but also from the Great manual by means of the Grand Great.

Also, some divisions are playable on two manuals. For example, the Choir-Swell division is usually played from the Choir manual, but it has been duplexed stop key for stop key to the Swell manual, so that all the stops can also be played from there as the Swell-Choir, no matter what stops are drawn on the Choir manual. The same is true for the Great-Solo, which is usually played from the Great manual, but can also be played as the Solo-Great from the Solo manual.

Although the four Gallery divisions can be played from any manual, their "home" is the Bombard manual. Not only are they the only divisions playable from it, but its keyslip contains the pistons for the Gallery organ.

Stops 

In addition to 852 stopkeys controlling the speaking stops summarised above, the organ console also has the following:
 35 melodic percussion stopkeys
 46 non-melodic percussion stopkeys
 18 individual tremolo stopkeys, plus one "master tremolo" stopkey
 164 couplers
 120 swell pedal selectives

64-foot Diaphone-Dulzian 
The organ possesses a unique stop in the organ world, the 64-foot Diaphone-Dulzian in the Right Stage chamber (Pedal Right division), one of only two true 64-foot stops in the world. (The other 64-foot stop is the Contra-Trombone reed stop in the Sydney Town Hall Grand Organ.) The stop is unique, because it is a reed/diaphone hybrid.

When construction of the organ commenced, it was planned to have two 64-foot stops in the pedal, a Diaphone Profunda and a Dulzian, in the Right Stage and Left Stage chambers respectively. Later, the design was revised, and the Diaphone was cut, because it was feared it would crowd the Right Stage chamber (due to the width of the pipes). Consequently, the Dulzian was moved to the Right Stage chamber. However, the sound of the 64-foot Dulzian did not meet the criteria, requiring Diaphone pipes to be used for the lowest 22 notes. The remaining pipes in the rank are reeds. Because of the low frequencies involved, and because the diaphone is voiced to imitate a reed stop, the transition from reed to diaphone cannot be detected.

The two lowest pipes (CCCCC and CCCCC#) are fed by a single, dedicated 8-inch diameter wind line, operating on 35 inches of pressure. A second identical wind line feeds the remaining pipes.

The Diaphone-Dulzian rank spans from C3 to g2; it is sufficiently extended so that the 64-, 32-, 16-, 8- and 4-foot unison stops, and the -foot, -foot and -foot mutation stops, may be drawn from the same rank. No other extension rank in the world spans that far. Also, when the 64-foot and -foot are combined, the resultant tone simulates a 128-foot stop, equivalent to a 4 Hz tone on low C.

Use of the Diaphone-Dulzian is rare, being used primarily in registrations of moderate volume - in very big combinations it is lost, and in smaller ones it is too loud. Nonetheless, when the stop was first tested in 1930, it caused tiles to fall from the auditorium ceiling and structural elements of the building to rattle.

Grand Ophicleide 
The Grand Ophicleide in the organ's Pedal Right division, behind the Right Stage chamber grill, speaking on 100" wind pressure, is recognized by Guinness World Records as the loudest organ stop in the world. It is described as having "a pure trumpet note of ear-splitting volume, more than six times the volume of the loudest locomotive whistle." The Grand Ophicleide produces up to 130 decibels at a distance of 1 meter, and is designed to be heard over any other stops that might be playing. The pipes were built by Roscoe Evans, who served as the organ's first curator.

Because of the high pressure on which the pipes stand, they must be tightly secured to the pipe chest, with individual parts secured to each other. If any wind leaks, a whistle, almost as loud as the tone of the pipes themselves, may be heard. Completing the rank presented a problem; the highest 12 notes are produced by special flue pipes having a similar voice and timbre. All of the reed pipes use weighted tongues. The tuning wires are held firmly in place to maintain the correct tuning. The 8' rank is made from lead alloy of exceptional thickness (to prevent the pipes from cracking under the extreme sonic vibrations), while the 16' rank is made of wood.

The Grand Ophicleide rank is extended one octave above the 16' unison rank, allowing an 8' register to be drawn from the rank; it is playable from the 85-key Great manual and from the 32-key pedalboard.

32-foot stops 
To provide all the power needed in the pedal, the organ has ten 32-foot stops:

Records 
The organ has been recognized by Guinness World Records as the largest musical instrument, the loudest musical instrument and the largest pipe organ ever constructed, although some debate still exists about the last. Guinness also recognizes the Grand Ophicleide 16′ in the Pedal Right division to be the loudest organ stop in the world.

The organ was recognized by the Organ Historical Society as an instrument "of historical value and worthy of preservation" as part of its Historic Organs Citations program. The Citation, No. 313, was presented to the New Jersey Sports and Exposition Authority by Paul Marchesano on October 26, 2004.

Officially, the organ has 33,112 pipes, but the exact number of pipes is unknown. A detailed survey conducted in 1999 concluded that the organ had 33,114 pipes, recently revised it to 33,116 after the discovery that one rank went down two notes lower than specified in the organ builder's contract. It is very hard to determine exactly how many pipes the organ has, also due to the condition the organ is in (see "Current state" below).

The organ is the only one in the world to have stops standing on 100 inches wind pressure. It is also the only organ to have two 32-foot pedal stops on 50 inches wind pressure. There are two more organs in the world with stops on 50 inches, but these are 8-foot solo trumpet or tuba stops. 100 inches wind pressure (equivalent to 3.56 psi or 0.25 bars) is about 30 times more than a normal organ stop (even high-pressure stops usually only stand on 10 to 12 inches). The organ has four stops on 100 inches (also known as the Big Reeds) and ten stops on 50 inches wind pressure:

Apart from the aforementioned stops on record wind pressure, almost every division stands on at least 15 inches wind pressure, except for the Choir which stands on 10 inches, and the Unenclosed Choir stands on 3 3/4". Also, some individual stops stand on lower wind pressure, for example, the Diapason X of the Great division stands on only 4 inches.

The organ's wind supply is the most powerful ever used in a pipe organ. The Right Stage chamber has two dedicated blowers, a high-pressure blower and a low-pressure blower. A step-up blower is fed from the low-pressure blower, and provides 100" pressure to the two 100" reeds in the Right Stage chamber and the two 100" reeds in the Right Center chamber. The Left Stage chamber is similar in having a high-pressure and a low-pressure blower, with the low-pressure blower originally also winding the Left Forward chamber. However renovations to the arena resulted in cut windlines going through walls that no longer exist. The Left Forward chamber will soon be winded from its own independent blower in a new location. The Left Center chamber and Left Upper chambers are winded from a common blower, and the Right Forward, Right Center, and Right Upper chambers are fed from a common blower, less the two 100" reeds in the Right Center chamber.

1944 damage 

The instrument has not been fully functional since the 1944 Great Atlantic Hurricane, when the 4 subterranean floors of the Boardwalk Hall were flooded with seawater. This caused large amounts of damage to the blowers and especially the combination action mechanism.

1998 restoration 

In September 1998, the New Jersey Sports and Exposition Authority provided a $1.17 million grant, which was used to return the Right Stage Chamber of the Main Auditorium organ and the entire Ballroom (Kimball) Organ to playable condition. Afterwards, a recording session took place, which captured the organ's record holders (the 64′ Diaphone-Dulzian, and the 100″ Tuba Imperial and Grand Ophicleide).

2001 damage 

Further damage to the organ took place during a 2001 renovation of Boardwalk Hall due to lack of planning and oversight and the carelessness of workmen.  Pipes were removed, bent, and stepped on. (Organ pipes are made from soft alloys based on lead, so it is very easy to dent or crush them.) The 32-foot Trombone stop was effectively entombed in the building's walls when an opening in one of the upper chambers, which allowed the rank to speak through the grille in the ceiling, was sealed off. Windlines to various pipe chambers were cut, with no effort to identify the lines, nor any plans to re-route or repair them. The relay for the left stage chamber was cut out without regard to its restoration, and various switching and control cables were cut.  The 5-manual console connection was cut. Cement dust disrupted the switching contacts, magnets and the organ pipes. All this left the entire organ damaged and the Right Stage chamber, which was 98% operational in 1998, completely disabled.  The relay of the Ballroom Organ was also removed in a careless way, which rendered that organ unplayable as well.

Ongoing restoration 

In 2013, the organ once again began to be restored, with 15-20% of the organ operational. The organ was played in September 2013 during the Miss America pageant, its first public performance in 40 years. Since May 2014, free half-hour noon concerts followed by free half-hour tours are offered Monday through Friday from May through October, excluding holidays. , in-depth "behind the scenes" tours are available weekly on Wednesdays at 10 a.m. throughout the year.

Both organs of the hall (the Ballroom features a 4/55 Kimball opus 7073) have begun to slowly return to the regular musical life of the building as their mechanical condition permits.

The current restoration project led by the Historic Organ Restoration Committee (HORC, a 501(c) organization) is a $16M project entirely funded by donations from the general public and charitable foundations.  Since the inception of the project, 2014 is the first year that the restoration effort has been fully funded.  The restoration effort focuses on the re-leathering of the entire instrument as well as the correction of damage to pipework and mechanical systems sustained from construction and water in the intervening years.

Dr. Steven Ball was named titular organist on July 1, 2013. On September 1, 2015 Nathan Bryson became the fifth Curator of Organs at Boardwalk Hall. Full restoration of the organ is estimated to cost up to $13 million.

In 2016, the Left Stage chamber was brought online for the first time in decades, with a special recital in July. This chamber is now fully operational and restored and work was completed in 2019.

HORC reports that , 95% of the Ballroom Organ is operational, and more than 60% of the Main Auditorium organ is operational. Restoration work is ongoing and proceeding.

See also 
List of notable pipe organs
[Organ Historical Society Database information https://pipeorgandatabase.org/organ/14488]]

References

External links 
 Historic Organ Restoration Committee  Official website for the Historic Organ Restoration Committee
 Boardwalk Hall   Official website for Boardwalk Hall
 Boardwalk Pipes Stephen D. Smith's book Atlantic City's Musical Masterpiece online
 Organ Historical Society
 The entire stoplist of the Auditorium organ on The Organ Site (in German)
 Ultimate Restorations web site; see also their video program and short pieces.

Music of New Jersey
Individual pipe organs
Culture of Atlantic City, New Jersey
Public venues with a theatre organ
Auditorium Organ